The first 19 locomotives ordered by Isambard Kingdom Brunel for the Great Western Railway included three 2-2-2 Sharp, Roberts locomotives. They were built by  Sharp, Roberts and Company and the most successful of the early designs, two lasting until the 1870s.

The original  cylinders were replaced from 1844 by larger  or  ones.

Locomotives
 Lion (Sharp, Roberts R; 1838–1847) 
 Atlas (Sharp, Roberts S; 1838–1872)
This locomotive was rebuilt as a 2-2-2T tank locomotive in 1860. After it was withdrawn it was sold to a Mr Glasbrook in Swansea.
 Eagle (Sharp, Roberts T; 1838–1871)
This locomotive was rebuilt as a 2-2-2T tank locomotive in 1860.

References

 
 

Sharp Roberts
Broad gauge (7 feet) railway locomotives
2-2-2 locomotives
Early steam locomotives
Steam locomotives of Great Britain
Sharp Stewart locomotives
Railway locomotives introduced in 1838
Scrapped locomotives
Passenger locomotives